The following is a list of events affecting Philippine television in 2012. Events listed include television show debuts, finales, cancellations, and channel launches, closures and rebrandings, as well as information about controversies and carriage disputes.

Events

January
 January 27 – CCP Bobcats wins as Showtime Campus Clash Edition Grand Champion.

February
 February 4 – Koreen Medina emerged as HYY's My Girl Grand Winner held at the AFP Theater.

March
March 5 – TV Patrol celebrated its 25 years of broadcasts.
March 10 – In Manny Many Prizes Easy Manny Jackpot Round, Joey wins .
March 31
Slater Young from Visayas wins season 4 of Pinoy Big Brother, became the show's first male winner.
Panghulo National High School was hailed as Eat Bulaga's Pinoy Henyo High Alumni Edition Grand Champion by guessing three words in 2 minutes and 8.68 seconds.

April
 April 28 – Bacolod Masskara from Bacolod, Negros Occidental wins as Showtime's fifth grand champion (Showtime Inter-Town Edition grand champion) on the noontime TV program, It's Showtime.

May
May 6
Raymart Santiago, along with Claudine Barretto and his 8-man entourage, assaulted a known journalist and senior citizen, Ramon Tulfo, due to Ramon purportedly using his mobile phone to take photos of Claudine screaming at and humiliating a ground attendant of Cebu Pacific concerning missing luggage which supposedly contained asthma medicine for their friend's children. This occurred within NAIA Terminal 3 in a location not covered by CCTV. Witnesses state that the brawl began when Raymart and his entourage surrounded Tulfo and demanded that he hand over his phone. Ramon refused and the assault commenced. A video of the brawl that was recorded and posted on YouTube clearly shows Raymart choking Tulfo while encouraging his friends to throw punches at him. Claudine can clearly be seen attacking Tulfo as well. The airport guards eventually stopped the attack and escorts Ramon away while Raymart follows alongside screaming obscenities at him. A few days after the incident, Claudine Barretto filed assault and child abuse charges on Ramon Tulfo as they claim that he (Tulfo) initiated the attack. Claudine also states that she has a witness to her claim. The name of the witness was not given and he has not given his account of the incident to anybody but Claudine. The rationale behind the child abuse charges, according to Claudine, comes from the fact(?) that Ramon (allegedly) begins the assault in front of her children, traumatizing them. Upon questioning the ground attendant Claudine was heckling, it was Raymart and their entourage who had initiated the assault.
Astroboy was hailed as the Ultimate Talentado in Talentadong Pinoy Season 3.
May 18: Episode of TV5's Sharon: Kasama Mo, Kapatid, Tulfo made an appearance in the Episode title Boys to Men with his brothers Raffy and Erwin.
May 27
Episode of ABS-CBN's Gandang Gabi, Vice!, Tulfo made an appearance as Vice Ganda's guest for interview & sampling of his talent in dancing. After the dance, Ganda gave Tulfo a Gift a Video Camera.
Miss Philippines Earth 2012 was held at the Center Stage of SM Mall of Asia in Pasay. Stephany Stefanowitz of Quezon City won the pageant.

June
June 2: Paco Catholic School was hailed as Eat Bulaga's Junior Pinoy Henyo 2012 Grand Champion by guessing 8 words.
June 6: Episode of ABS-CBN's Kris TV, Tulfo made an appearance as Kris Aquino's guest for interview, sampling of his Aikido where he is a Black belter. and a preview in his Eatery along with his son Ramon "Bon" Tulfo, III.
June 7: Kapuso Network's 5th originating station is GMA Ilocos, which covers Ilocos Norte, Ilocos Sur and Abra following the establishments of GMA Cebu, GMA Davao and GMA Iloilo in 1999 and GMA Dagupan in 2008. On June 25, Balitang Ilokano was launched as its flagship local newscast.
June 9: Ryzza Mae Dizon from Angeles City, Pampanga was crowned as Little Miss Philippines 2012.
June 23
ABS-CBN launched the Philippine version of The X Factor.
University of Santo Tomas was hailed as Eat Bulaga's Pinoy Henyo Intercollegiate Edition 2012 Grand Champion by guessing 7 words.

July
July 7: 17-year-old Myrtle Sarrosa emerged as the Teen Big Winner of Pinoy Big Brother: Teen Edition 4.
July 16: Eat Bulaga! Indonesia is the first international franchise in Indonesia.

August
August 10: The 6th originating station of Kapuso Network is GMA Bicol, which covers the Bicol Region and on September 17, it launched its flagship local newscast Baretang Bikol.

September 
 September 15 – John Edric Ulang from Binangonan, Rizal emerged as Eat Bulaga!'s Mr. Pogi 2012 grand winner.

October
October 14: KZ Tandingan wins the first season of The X Factor Philippines.
October 20
 CHASE is now known as Jack City; the first local general entertainment TV station. Its Jack TV's second counterpart channel Owned by Broadcast Enterprises and Affiliated Media, Inc. and Solar Television Network.
 Gollayan family of Santiago, Isabela was hailed as Bida Kapamilya Grand Champion on It's Showtime.
October 21: Pedro Calungsod was canonized in Vatican City, and is the 2nd Filipino saint.
October 27
Lauren Dyogi announced that there is a triple tie after the results. Anne Curtis/Karylle, Jugs Jugueta/Teddy Corpuz, and Billy Crawford/Vhong Navarro were hailed as the third anniversary champions on It's Showtime.
Samaria was hailed as Eat Bulaga Battle of the Bands grand winner.
October 30: Talk TV is now known as Solar News Channel; the first local news TV station Owned by Southern Broadcasting Network and Solar Television Network.
October 31: GEM TV is now known as INC TV; the first local TV station owned by Christian Era Broadcasting Service.

November 
 November 10 – Cool Kids Crew and Michael V. hailed as the winner of Eat Bulaga Kids' Dance Showdown.
 November 24 – Melvin Tudtud from Cebu City emerged as Eat Bulaga!'s D'Kilabots: Mr. Pogi, Weh? grand winner.

Premieres

Unknown Dates
 August: UNTV News on UNTV
 September : I Am Meg on ETC

Returning or renamed programs

Programs transferring networks

Finales

Networks
The following is a list of Free-to-Air and Local Cable Networks making noteworthy launches and closures during 2012.

Launches

Rebranded
The following is a list of television stations that have made or will make noteworthy network rebranded in 2012.

Closures

Births
 August 22: Sebastian Benedict, actor
 October 17: Baylee van den Berg, half-South African model and actress
 November 22: Ayesha Zara Kurdi Soldevilla, Daughter of Yasmien Kurdi

Deaths
January 29: Maan Panganiban, former courtside reporter turn News5 reporter, lymphoma (born 1986)
February 18: Linda Estrella, Filipina movie star from Sampaguita Pictures (born 1922)
March 2: Isagani Yambot, veteran Philippine newsman and publisher of Philippine Daily Inquirer, heart attack (born 1934)
March 15: Luis Gonzales, Filipino movie star from Sampaguita Pictures, pneumonia (born 1928)
April 5: Angelo Castro Jr., former ABS-CBN anchor and journalist, cancer (born 1945)
April 6: Nita Javier, former LVN actress, cancer (born 1932)
June 26: Mario O'Hara, award-winning director, leukemia (born 1944)
July 8: Buboy Favor, executive producer of various GMA Network shows
July 10: Dolphy, actor and comedian dubbed the "King of Comedy", chronic obstructive pulmonary disease and multiple organ failure (born 1928)
August 18: Jesse Robredo, Department of the Interior and Local Government secretary, plane crash (born 1958)
September 25: Jun Bote Bautista, news broadcaster and journalist (born 1939)
September 30: Butch Maniego, sportscaster and executive director of the PBA D-League (born 1962)
October 8: Marilou Diaz-Abaya, multi-awarded film director, breast cancer (born 1955)
November 6: Julie Ann Rodelas, talent and model of ABS-CBN, murder (born 1992)
November 26: Celso Ad. Castillo, award-winning film director, screenwriter and actor, heart attack (born 1943)

See also
2012 in television

References

 
Television in the Philippines by year
Philippine television-related lists